"Great Britain and Northern Ireland" competed at the 2017 IAAF World Championships in London, from 4–13 August 2017. It was the first time that the United Kingdom had hosted the World Championships. Mo Farah won the first medal for the host nation, also winning the first gold medal of the Championships (in the 10,000 metres).

Medallists 

* – Indicates the athlete competed in preliminaries but not the final

Medal and performance targets

UK Sport targeted a minimum of 6 medals for London 2017, just slightly fewer than the set target of seven medals from the 2016 Summer Olympics Athletics events. The GB squad met this target on 13 August and finished with a total of 6 medals.

Results

Men
Track and road events

* – Indicates the athlete competed in preliminaries but not the final

Field events

Combined events – Decathlon

Women
Track and road events

* – Indicates the athlete competed in preliminaries but not the final

Field events

Combined events – Heptathlon

Key
Q = Qualified for the next round
q = Qualified for the next round as a fastest loser or, in field events, by position without achieving the qualifying target
NR = National record
AR = Area/Continental record
PB = Personal best
SB = Season's best
N/A = Round not applicable for the event

References

Nations at the 2017 World Championships in Athletics
World Championships in Athletics
Great Britain and Northern Ireland at the World Championships in Athletics